Barlieu is a commune in the Cher department in the Centre-Val de Loire region of France.

History
In 1136, a papal bull mentioned the church at Barlieu as "Ecclesiam de Barlocco. The parish church, dedicated to Saint Germain, was initially appointed to the abbot of Saint-Satur and a priory, called the "chaplaincy Barlieu", was built here. 
As an old fortified place with a public square, the village belonged to the house of Sancerre in 1152. In 1190, before his departure for the Crusades, Count Stephen I, Count of Sancerre, gave the residents "the customs of Lorris", which allowed them to hold markets and fairs. At the beginning of the fifteenth century, the lordship of Barlieu was sold to Martin of Charpaigne Gouge, bishop of Clermont and Chancellor to the Duke of Berry. Later, Jacques de Montmorin inherited the place and sold it to Jacques Coeur in 1448 for the sum of two thousand gold crowns. In 1458, following Coeur’s downfall, the seigneury of Barlieu was purchased by John V of Bueil, Count of Sancerre. The land remained in the hands of the Bueil family until 1628, when it was acquired by Henry II de Bourbon, prince de Condé, the governor of Berry. The last seigneur was Louise-Élisabeth de Bourbon-Condé, Countess of Sancerre, who died in 1775.

Geography

Population

Places of interest
 The church of St. Germain, dating from the twelfth century.
 A watermill.

See also
Communes of the Cher department

References

Communes of Cher (department)